Bill Carrothers (born July 13, 1964) is a jazz pianist and composer based in the Upper Peninsula of Michigan. He has cited Clifford Brown, Shirley Horn, and Oscar Peterson as influences on his development as a musician. Carrothers performs without shoes to better feel the piano pedals, and sits in a chair rather than on a traditional piano bench in order to achieve his preferred seating height.

Career
Carrothers began playing piano at age five, studying with his church organist before learning jazz from pianist Bobby Peterson.  By age 15 he was performing in jazz clubs, and in 1982 he briefly attended North Texas State University. 

After a year at North Texas, Carrothers was a member of Irv Williams' band before moving to New York City in 1988. He performed at the Knitting Factory, The Village Gate, and Birdland as well as Blues Alley in Washington, D.C. He has worked with Buddy DeFranco, Curtis Fuller, Billy Higgins, Freddie Hubbard, Lee Konitz, James Moody, Gary Peacock, Dewey Redman, Charlie Rouse, James Spaulding, Terell Stafford, Toots Thielemans, and Prince.  

Carrothers has performed in France at the New Morning, Nevers Jazz Festival, and Marciac Festival, in Belgium at the Audi Jazz Festival and Jazz Middelheim, and he headlined the Rising Star Tour in October, 2000 through Germany, Austria, and Switzerland.  In July, 2009, Carrothers played a week-long stand at the Village Vanguard with his European trio (Nicolas Thys and Dre Pallemaerts), a recording of which was released in 2011.  In his home state of Michigan, Carrothers performed a solo piano concert at the Gilmore International Keyboard Festival in April, 2010, and he made his Monterey Jazz Festival debut in September, 2011.  He is also a regular on the Chicago scene, having performed at the Chicago Jazz Festival, the Green Mill, and The Jazz Showcase. In 2011, Carrothers became an adjunct professor at Lawrence University in Wisconsin. In 2017, Carrothers began performing with the Copper Cats on The Red Jacket Jamboree.

Awards and honors
Carrothers was awarded the Grand Prix du Disque for Jazz in 2004 and was nominated for the Les Victoires du Jazz (French Grammy Award equivalent) in 2005 and 2011.

Discography

As leader

As sideman
 Brownmark, Just Like That (Motown, 1988)
 Scott Colley, Subliminal (Criss Cross, 1997)
 Dave Douglas, Moving Portrait (DIW, 1998)
 Happy Apple, Part of the Solutionproblem (No Alternative, Liberation Mob 1998)
 Gordon Johnson, Trios (Igmod, 1996)
 Dave King, I've Been Ringing You (Sunnyside, 2012)
 John McKenna, Apparition (Igmod, 1998)
 Andy Scherrer, Wrong Is Right (TCB, 2007)
 Andy Scherrer, Ornithology (Kelso, 2013)
 Bill Stewart, Snide Remarks (Blue Note, 1995)
 Bill Stewart, Telepathy (Blue Note, 1997)
 Bill Stewart, Space Squid (Pirouet, 2015)
 Ira Sullivan, After Hours (Go Jazz, 2000)
 Bobby Z., Bobby Z (Virgin, 1989)
 Kevin Brady,’’Common Ground’’ (LRP Records,2007)
 Kevin Brady,’’Zeitgeist’’ (Fresh Sounds New Talent Records,2009)
 Kevin Brady,’’Ensam’’ (LRP Records,2016)
 Kevin Brady,’’Plan B’’ (Ubuntu Music,2021)

References

American jazz pianists
American male pianists
American jazz composers
American male jazz composers
1964 births
Living people
20th-century American pianists
21st-century American pianists
20th-century American male musicians
21st-century American male musicians
Pirouet Records artists